Stephanie Graf (born 26 April 1973, in Klagenfurt) is an Austrian former middle distance runner who won silver medals in the 800 metres at both the Olympic Games and the World Athletics Championships. In June 2010 Graf was suspended for two years for an anti-doping rule violation.

Biography
Graf finished second to Maria de Lurdes Mutola in the women's 800 meters at both the 2000 Olympics in Sydney and the 2001 World Athletics Championships in Edmonton, Alberta. Her time from the 2000 Olympics, 1:56.64 minutes, is the current Austrian 800 metres record.

Proceedings were issued against Graf by the Austria's anti-doping authority in May 2010. Following the revelation that the Humanplasma laboratory had aided around 30 athletes with blood doping practices, Graf admitted that her blood had been taken at the lab, but insisted that it had never been re-injected (which would have improved her performances).

In June 2010 Graf was suspended for two years for the attempted use of a prohibited method.

References

External links

Official website

1973 births
Austrian female middle-distance runners
Austrian sportspeople in doping cases
Athletes (track and field) at the 2000 Summer Olympics
Doping cases in athletics
European Athletics Championships medalists
Living people
Medalists at the 2000 Summer Olympics
Olympic athletes of Austria
Olympic silver medalists for Austria
Olympic silver medalists in athletics (track and field)
Sportspeople from Klagenfurt
World Athletics Championships medalists
Goodwill Games medalists in athletics
European Athlete of the Year winners
Competitors at the 2001 Goodwill Games